The K7025/7026 Harbin-Qitaihe Through Train is Chinese railway running between Harbin to Qitaihe express passenger trains by the Harbin Railway Bureau, Harbin passenger segment responsible for passenger transport task, Habin originating on the Qitaihe train. 25G Type Passenger trains running along the Binsui Railway, Tujia Railway and Boqi Railway across Heilongjiang provinces, the entire 596 km. Harbin East Railway Station to Qitaihe Railway Station running 10 hours and 16 minutes, use trips for K7025; Qitaihe Railway Station to Harbin East Railway Station to run 9 hours and 48 minutes, use trips for K7026.

See also 
K7225/7226 Harbin-Qitaihe Through Train

References 

Passenger rail transport in China
Rail transport in Heilongjiang